The International Forum for Democratic Studies (IFDS) is an initiative of the National Endowment for Democracy (NED). Established in April 1994, its programs include the Journal of Democracy (which has Spanish and Portuguese editions), the Network of Democracy Research Institutes, and fellowship programs such as the Reagan–Fascell Democracy Fellowship.

Larry Diamond was the Forum's founding co-director (1994-2009).

References

External links
 International Forum for Democratic Studies
 Network of Democracy Research Institutes, Member Institutes
 "International Forum for Democratic Studies Established by the National Endowment for Democracy", Marc F. Plattner and Larry Diamond, PS: Political Science and Politics, Vol. 28, No. 1 (Mar., 1995), pp. 113-115

National Endowment for Democracy
1994 establishments in the United States